Gullinbursti (Old Norse: , meaning "Gold Mane" or "Golden Bristles") is a boar in Norse mythology.

When Loki had Sif's hair, Freyr's ship Skíðblaðnir, and Odin's spear Gungnir fashioned by the Sons of Ivaldi, he bet his own head with Brokkr that his brother Eitri (Sindri) would not have been able to make items to match the quality of those mentioned above.

So to make gifts to Freyr, Eitri threw a pig's skin into a furnace as Brokkr worked on the bellows, and together they manufactured the boar Gullinbursti which had bristles in its mane that glowed in the dark.

The story of Gullinbursti's creation is related in the Skáldskaparmál section of Snorri Sturluson's Prose Edda.

According to Húsdrápa, Freyr rode Gullinbursti to Baldr's funeral, while in Gylfaginning, Snorri states that Freyr rode to the funeral in a chariot pulled by the boar.

The boar is also known as Slíðrugtanni (Old Norse: meaning "Sharp Tooth" or "Fearsome Tooth") (sometimes anglicized to "Slidrugtanni").

In fairy tales
In a Dutch fairy tale, a fairy prince named Fro, son of Nerthus, sculpts with gold The Pig with the Golden Bristles, named Gullin in the story.

References

Creatures in Norse mythology
Freyr
Mythological pigs
Wild boars